University of Applied Sciences Leiden (abbreviated as UAS Leiden), is a vocational university in the western Netherlands, located in the city of Leiden. It currently has approximately 12,000 students, mainly studying towards associate and bachelor's degrees. The school also offers master's degrees in nursing and physical therapy.

Admissions 
UAS Leiden offers programmes in both English and Dutch, though the options are broader in Dutch. International students enrolling in a Dutch programme are required to obtain an NT2-II (Nederlands taal 2, Dutch as a second language) diploma as proof of competency.

Faculties 
UAS Leiden currently accepts enrollments from students in the following areas:
 Faculty of Health
 Faculty of Social Work and Applied Psychology
 Faculty of Management and Business
 Faculty of Science &  Technology
 Faculty of Education

References

External links 
  University of Applied Sciences Leiden website

Leiden
Buildings and structures in Leiden
Education in South Holland